Bojanovice is the name of several locations in the Czech Republic:

 Bojanovice (Prague-West District), a village in the Central Bohemian Region
 Bojanovice (Znojmo District), a village in the South Moravian Region

It may also refer to:
 Dolní Bojanovice, a village in the South Moravian Region
 Horní Bojanovice, a village in the South Moravian Region